The 1995 ECO summit was the third Economic Cooperation Organization summit, held 14–15 May 1995 in Islamabad, Pakistan.

Attending delegations
 President Burhanuddin Rabbani 
 President Heydar Aliyev 
 President Akbar Hashemi Rafsanjani  
 First Deputy Prime Minister Nigmatjan K. Isingarin 
 President Askar Akaev  
 Prime Minister Benazir Bhutto  
 Chairman Emomali Rahman 
 President Suleyman Demirel 
 President Saparmurad Niyazov

References

trẻ chậm nói

External links
bại não

20th-century diplomatic conferences
1995 in Pakistan
1995 in international relations
1995 conferences
Economic Cooperation Organization summits
Islamabad
20th century in Islamabad